Sandra Bowman (born 10 April 1967) is a British swimmer.

Swimming career
Bowman competed in the women's 100 metre breaststroke at the 1984 Summer Olympics. She represented England in the 100 and 200 metres breaststroke events, at the 1982 Commonwealth Games in Brisbane, Queensland, Australia. She also won the 1984 and 1985 ASA National Championship title in the 100 metres breaststroke.

Personal life
Her sister Janet Bowman (married name Williams) was also an international swimmer.

References

External links
 

1967 births
Living people
British female swimmers
Olympic swimmers of Great Britain
Swimmers at the 1984 Summer Olympics
Swimmers at the 1982 Commonwealth Games
Sportspeople from Darlington
Commonwealth Games competitors for England
20th-century British women